Baek Musan (born 1955) is a South Korean poet and labor activist.

Life 
Baek Mu-san was born in 1955 in Yeongcheon, Gyeongbuk. His birth name is Baek Bong-seok. Since his debut in 1984, Baek Mu-san received much attention as a writer who had been a conglomerate factory worker. He is seen as one of the poets that represent 1980s labor poetry along with Park Nohae.

Particularly, for his poetry collection  (동트는 미포만의 새벽을 딛고 Stepping Upon the Early Morning of Mipo Bay at Dawn) (Nodong Munhaksa, 1990), he received much attention by writing the Ulsan Hyundai Heavy Industries full scale strike that occurred for 4 months from late 1988 and early 1989 into a one long poem. It was also seen as having directly expressed the fight of the labor class, announcing for ‘gaining power for the labor class through political organization. Baek Mu-san was active constantly after the 1990s as well, widening his scope of interest from living conditions of laborers to criticizing the root of the violent nature of capital and environmental problems, writing poetry that delves into the causes of human existence that has overcome capital's value. He was awarded the first Isan Literary Award in 1989, the 12th Manhae Literature Prize in 1997, the second Oh Jang-hwan Literature Prize in 2009, and the first Imhwa Literature Prize in 2009. He was also the recipient of the 20th Daesan Literary Award for Poetry in 2012. He won the Baek Seok Literary Award in 2015.

 Writing 
Baek Mu-san is a symbolic figure that represents South Korea's labor poetry. With consistent poetic mind that has its roots in the life of labor, and ceaseless renewal, he has contributed toward raising the reputation of labor poetry. More than anything, the footsteps he had taken, that have been known as the unchanging symbol of ‘worker poet’, became clearer and deeper as time passed. With poetry thick with criticism on the infinite expansion of capital, and exploration on the roots of human existence that overcomes the value of capital, Baek Mu-san has received the admiration of many. Even when labor literature passed through its heyday during the 1980s and the early 1990s, then lowered its banner and raised another flag, he still constantly kept his focus on the reality that we were in, and sincerely studied humanity and labor. His poetic universe has evolved widely and deeply, from simply exposing the tragic reality of labor to sincerely studying politics and economics as conditions of life that surround people. He writes with emotional but strong voice the threats of the breakdown of humanity and environmental destruction in the modern world, brought on by radical capitalism. 
Based in strict realism, Baek Mu-san's poetry is direct and honest. As he writes poetry based on the agonizing reality of oppression by the greed and violence of capital, the poet does not ever ignore the tragic reality faced by people going on with their lives. Therefore, Baek Mu-san's poetry makes one realize that deep thought and honesty associated with human existence and life's issues, are the life force of poetry. He displays a unique world of poetry, where he displays keen awareness that cuts right through the ruins of a capitalist society, as well as sees the limits and possibilities faced by life of the time with eyes of deep suffering. His sober view that face the tragedy of life surrounded by violence and oppression of capital, as well as his fearless voice toward an unjust world, come out as a heavy echo. Thus, Baek Mu-san still remains in the place of labor, reminding himself of the day when the world will welcome revolution and change, continuing his song of hope to this day.

 Works 
 Poetry collections 
  (만국의 노동자여 Workers of the World) (Cheongsa, 1989)
  (동트는 미포만의 새벽을 딛고 Stepping Upon the Early Morning of Mipo Bay at Dawn) (Nodong Munhaksa, 1990)
  (인간의 시간 The Time of Humans) (Changbi, 1996)
  (길은 광야의 것이다 The Path Belongs to the Field) (Changbi, 1999)
  (초심 The Original Intention) (Silcheon Munhaksa, 2003)
  (길 밖의 길 The Road Outside of the Road) (Galmuri, 2004)
  (거대한 일상 The Giant Daily Life) (Changbi, 2008)
  (그 모든 가장자리 All the Edges) (Changbi, 2012)
  (그대 없이 저녁은 오고 The Evening Comes Without You) (ZMANZ, 2012)
 '' (폐허를 인양하다 Recovering a Ruin) (Changbi, 2015)

Works in Translation 
 El Tiempo Humano (Spanish)

Awards 
 1989 1st Isan Literary Award 
 1997 12th Manhae Literature Prize 
 2007 6th Beautiful Writer Award
 2009 2nd Oh Jang-hwan Literature Prize 
 2009 1st Imhwa Literature Prize 
 2012 20th Daesan Literary Award for Poetry 
 2015 17th Baek Seok Prize for Literature

Further reading 
 Jeong, Namyeong, “Making Change, Being Changed, and the Poetry of Baek Mu-san”, Dangdae Bipyeong 7, 1999. 
 Go, Misook, “The Poetic Path of Subversion and Generation – On Baek Mu-san”, Bipyeong gigye (비평기계 The Critical Machine), Somyung Books, 2000.
 Yu, Seongho, “A Labor Poet’s Persistency and Change”, Literature and Practice, Spring 2004. 
 Lee, Kyeongsu, “A Landscape Painting With People”, Bul-onhan sangsangui chukje (불온한 상상의 축제 The Dangerous Festival of Imagination) Somyung Books, 2004.
 Nam, Gitaek, “Study On Baek Mu-san’s Poetry”, Literary Criticism 26, 2007. 
 Lee, Gi-in and Baek Mu-san, “Labor of the Future, and Labor Poetry of the Future”, Yeolrin Sihak, Spring 2008.
 Jo, Jeonghwan, “The Journey of Baek Mu-san’s Poetry and the Issue of Great Realism”, Literature and Practice, Winter 2009.
 Jeong, Uyeong, “Face Our Ruins”, The Quarterly Changbi, Winter, 2015.

References

External links 
"This Person, ‘The Power of Poetry’ That Even Revitalizes the Countryside."

Living people
1955 births
South Korean male poets
20th-century South Korean poets
21st-century South Korean poets
People from Yeongcheon
20th-century male writers
21st-century male writers